Dowker is a surname. Notable people with the surname include:

Clifford Hugh Dowker (1912–1982), Canadian mathematician
Fay Dowker (born 1965), British physicist
Felicity Dowker, Australian fantasy writer
Hasted Dowker (1900–1986), Canadian Anglican priest
Ray Dowker (1919–2004), New Zealand cricketer
Yael Dowker (1919–2016), Israeli-English mathematician

See also
Dowker Island, is an uninhabited island in Lake Saint Louis, a widening of the Saint Lawrence River south of Montreal Island, Quebec
Dowker notation, is mathematical notation
Dowker space, is mathematical field of general topology
The Haunting of Hewie Dowker, is an Australian film